(also known as Skyhigh) is a live-action, supernatural Japanese television drama series, starring actress and model, Yumiko Shaku.  It aired in Japan, first run, from 2003 to 2004, and was popular enough to spawn the 2003 feature film of the same name (produced while the series was still in production and starring the same actress).  Both are based on the Japanese manga, Skyhigh.  Shaku stars as Izuko, the Guardian of the Gate to the afterlife.

The basic premise of the television series is somewhat similar in concept to the American series, Ghost Whisperer, in which the protagonist must use her powers to guide the dead on their journey to the afterlife by helping them determine the meaning or circumstance of their death.  However, in Izuko's case, no matter how hard she tries, her guidance does not always result in a happy ending.

Plot
Izuko (Yumiko Shaku) is a beautiful and mysterious gatekeeper to the afterlife.  Known as the Guardian of the Gate, Izuko guides spirits of the recently departed on their journey...sometimes to Heaven, other times to Hell.  The decision is theirs and it is not always an easy one.  Often the spirit is the victim of a murder or other untimely death.  In such case, a soul is offered three options: 1) accept their death as it is and proceed into Heaven to await reincarnation.  2) Wander the Earth as a ghost.  3) Take justice into their own hands and face the gates of Hell.  Most episodes (see Episode List below) involve the guest starring character seeking to discover what happened to them and why—with Izuko attempting to guide them on the correct path.  To her sadness and despite her compassion, Izuko does not always succeed and the moral dilemma is often very grey and unfair.

We discover in the big budget prequel (theatrical) film shot between Seasons 1 and 2, Sky High (2003 film) Izuko once faced this same decision herself.  In life, her name was Mina…murdered by a supernatural serial killer.  In the movie, Mina takes the place of the previous Guardian, killed by a demon.  Mina is then unwittingly thrust into the role she plays in the TV series as Izuko, Guardian of the Gate—responsible for guiding the dead to sometimes happy and sometimes heart breaking ends.

Production
Sky High premiered on the Japanese television network, TV-Asahi, on January 17, 2003.  The series starred popular Japanese actress and supermodel Yumiko Shaku, also known internationally for her starring role as action heroine JXSDF Lt. Akane Yashiro in two subsequent Godzilla movies, Godzilla Against Mechagodzilla (2002) and Godzilla: Tokyo S.O.S. (2003).  Sky High Season 1 (Series 1) ran for ten episodes, ending with a three-part thriller featuring special guest star Yamada Maiko.

Season 2 (marketed as Sky High 2) premiered on TV-Asahi on Friday, January 16, 2004, following the theatrical release of the big budget motion picture Sky High—a prequel to the TV series, and also starring Yumiko Shaku in a big screen reprise of her TV series role.  The second TV season of Sky High picks up on a number of elements from the big screen venture, including a darker, edgier look to Shaku's costuming in contrast to the softer, more colorful look of the first season.  The ninth episode of Season 2, titled "Fate," served as the series finale.

List of Sky High Episodes

References

External links
 
 IMDb Episode List (Season 1)
 Sky High Season 1 Official Site
 Sky High Season 2 Official Site
 Yumiko Shaku - Official site

Japanese drama television series
TV Asahi television dramas